Taylor Campbell (born 30 June 1996) is an English athlete specialising in the hammer throw. He finished fourth at the 2017 European U23 Championships and fifth at the 2018 Commonwealth Games. In addition, he won a bronze at the 2019 Summer Universiade.

His personal best in the event is 74.98 m set in Loughborough 2020, improved with 76.97 m at the same venue on 23 May 2021. He then realised 78.23 m at	Grosics Gyula Stadion, Tatabánya, on 5 June 2021.

International competitions

References

1996 births
Living people
English male hammer throwers
British male hammer throwers
Sportspeople from Slough
Athletes (track and field) at the 2018 Commonwealth Games
Universiade medalists in athletics (track and field)
Universiade bronze medalists for Great Britain
Medalists at the 2019 Summer Universiade
Commonwealth Games competitors for England
Athletes (track and field) at the 2020 Summer Olympics
British Athletics Championships winners
Olympic athletes of Great Britain